Marikina Heights is one of the largest barangays of Marikina measuring some . Once a privately owned hacienda, it is now populated by 35,416 people according to the 2010 National Census.

History

Before becoming a barangay in 1978, the area were once known as Sitio Mapunso and Sitio Kasuyan of Barrio Bayan-Bayanan(Present day Concepcion) and Barrio Parang(Present day Brgy. Parang and Fortune) with Champagnat Street serving as the boundary of its two mother barrios. Marikina Heights also started out as a grazing and pasture land for carabaos, cows, goats and horses. Because it was owned by the Tuason family, the Marikina Dairy Farm was established in what was now known as C&P Mall, Palmera Homes and the Tanseco Residence.

During the Japanese occupation, Marikina Heights became a vital military location as the Imperial soldiers dug through parts of the area leading to Paliparan, Sto. Nino and Concepcion where the airfields are situated. One of the said tunnels lies underneath a police sub-station along Bayan-Bayanan Avenue. When the combined Filipino and American troops retaken in Marikina Heights was defeat by the Japanese during the Allied liberation and ended in World War II.

Due to the land's terrain which resembles the highlands of South Korea, the area also became a training ground for Filipino soldiers prior to their deployment in the Korean War, thus earning the nickname "Mari-Korea".

The late 1950s witnessed the growth of the area as the Tuasons decided to develop their landholdings into the Marikina Heights subdivision. Finally, on April 2, 1978, President Ferdinand Marcos signed the Presidential Decree No. 1489, declaring Marikina Heights as another barangay in Marikina's growing populace.

Present day
Marikina Heights is now a lush barangay with abundant trees and well-maintained pocket parks such as Marikina-Yeongdo Friendship Park, Marikina-Brampton Friendship Park, Liwasang Kalayaan, Marikina Hardin ng Bayan and Marikina Heights Creekside Park. Marikina Heights became also a runner up in the cleanest waterways in the Metro Manila for its effort on maintaining the cleanliness of the Barangay's creek, the barangay also won the cleanest and greenest barangay in the Philippines during Pres. Erap's regime. One of the largest vacant lot in Marikina can also be seen within Marikina Heights which serves as its memory on its hilly terrain, the foothill along Champaca Street and Tanguile and in Empress 1 Subdivision and La Milagrosa Villages. Marikina's best exclusive schools are in this barangay; St. Scholastica's Academy Marikina (for girls) and Marist School (for boys). Ayala Malls Marikina, opened in 2017, is located here and along side it is the C&B Circle Mall Marikina.

Marikina Heights is also now a developing community. Numerous commercial and modern residencial developments have been popping up like Michelia Residences along General Ordonez Street. Executive Village are also found within the Barangay such as Empress 1 Subdivision, La Milagrosa Village, Marist Village, Mansion Hills etc.

References

Marikina
Barangays of Metro Manila